Events in world sport through the years 1726 to 1730.

Boxing
Events
 6 June 1727 – James Figg and Gravesend pipe-maker Ned Sutton fight a much-publicised match attended by more than 1,000 spectators.
  – Jack Broughton begins fighting professional boxing matches in London venues.

Cricket

Events
 1727 — Charles Lennox, 2nd Duke of Richmond was involved in the creation of Articles of Agreement to establish the rules under which two matches were played, the first time that a set of rules is known to have been put in writing.
 1728 — the earliest known instance of a county team (i.e., Kent) being acclaimed for its superiority over its rivals suggests the origin of the unofficial Champion County title.
 1729 — the earliest known innings victory was achieved and 1729 is the date of the oldest known cricket bat still in existence.

Horse racing
Events

References

Sources
 
 
 
 
 

1726